Gypsy Blood (German: Zigeunerblut) is a 1920 German silent film directed by Karl Otto Krause and starring Lya De Putti, Carl Fenz, and Paul Hansen. It is based on Georges Bizet's Carmen and should not be confused with the 1918 German silent Carmen.

Cast
 Lya De Putti 
 Carl Fenz 
 Paul Tenor 
 Max Laurence 
 Fritz Moleska

References

Bibliography
 Bock, Hans-Michael & Bergfelder, Tim. The Concise CineGraph. Encyclopedia of German Cinema. Berghahn Books, 2009.

External links

1920 films
Films of the Weimar Republic
Films directed by Karl Otto Krause
German silent feature films
Films about Romani people
German black-and-white films